No. 505 (Wessex) Squadron, Royal Auxiliary Air Force (RAuxAF) is a general support unit of the Royal Air Force's reserve component, the Royal Auxiliary Air Force.

Formation 
No. 505 (Wessex) Squadron was formed in June 2015 as the only RAF reserve squadron in South West England based at the recently re-commissioned RAF St Mawgan in Cornwall.  The squadron's formation was highlighted in the 'Future Reserves 2020 paper' announced in 2013, which would see the RAuxAF expand its trained strength by around 1,800.

In 2016, the squadron began recruiting, which by this time had become the newest reserve unit in the RAuxAF alongside another  seven new squadrons being formed.

Role 
Today the squadron recruits a wide range of specialists from South West England.  Squadron personnel include direct entrants with no previous military experience, ex-Regular personnel (from any Service), and those with skills directly transferable from civilian life.  The last reserve squadron based in the South-West was No. 2625 (County of Cornwall) Squadron RAuxAF which disbanded in 2016.

Roles available in the squadron include: intelligence analysts, drivers, chefs, suppliers, RAF police, and human resources specialists.

The squadron's current role is as a general support squadron to deploy reservists to support the RAF at home and worldwide.  Sitting under No. 2 Group RAF, the squadron is the only unit directly subordinated to the group.  According to a FOI(A) request responded to on 8 June 2021, the squadron has shifted to No. 1 Group.

The squadron's first commanding officer was Squadron Leader David Mann.

External links 

 Squadron Twitter page
 Squadron Facebook page

Footnotes

References 

 
{{

Military units and formations established in 2015
Wessex
Wessex